A wrap is a culinary dish made with a soft flatbread rolled around a filling.

The usual flatbreads are wheat tortillas, lavash, or pita; the filling may include cold sliced meat, poultry, or fish, shredded lettuce, diced tomato or pico de gallo, guacamole, sauteed mushrooms, bacon, grilled onions, cheese, and a sauce, such as ranch or honey mustard.

History

People in Mexico, Mediterranean, and South Asia have been eating wraps since around the 1900s. Mexicans refer to them as burritos, and they come in different varieties, primarily wheat flour or corn, typically filled with meat, beans, rice, cheese, and other ingredients.

The wrap in its Western form probably comes from California, as a generalization of the Mexican and Tex-Mex burrito, and became popular in the 1990s. It may have been invented and named at a southern California chain called "I Love Juicy" in the early 1980s. Shortly after the Box Lunch restaurant opened in 1977 in Wellfleet Massachusetts, the "Rollwich" became their signature menu item.  The OVO Bistro in NYC introduced its wrap sandwich in 1990 under the name "The King Edward," The Bobby Valentine Sports Gallery Cafe in Stamford, Connecticut, is sometimes claimed to have invented the wrap at about the same time, but Valentine is diffident about it: "Well, that's legend and folklore, but until somebody disputes me or comes up with a better story, I'll say I invented the wrap." Beth Dolan of Stamford, Connecticut, is the waitress credited for serving the first wrap after the restaurant had run out of bread. Moreover, Valentine's own story dates his use of the name 'wrap' to the mid-1990s, after it is documented in California. San Francisco-based chain World Wrapps, which opened its first location in February 1995, is credited with popularizing the wrap nationwide.  In 1988, Jeff Fairhall of Seattle created the Essential Sandwich – a rice and veggie wrap – which he distributed to local health food stores.  Within four years, he was making 10,000 wraps a week sold at 220 locations in Seattle.

Wraps in public eating places

In the 1900s, kati rolls became a popular street food in Kolkata, India, with kebab wrapped in paratha bread; although over the years many variants have evolved, all of which now go under the generic name of kati roll. Restaurants such as Camille's Sidewalk Cafe, Sonic Drive-In, Jason's Deli, Buffalo Wild Wings, Subway, Chick-fil-A, Roly Poly and McAlister's Deli , Le Wrap Factorie serve wraps. KFC now serves its chicken in a wrap as menu choice, with lettuce, mayonnaise and salsa. McDonald's had a snack wrap, with a fried or grilled chicken strip, lettuce, cheddar, and ranch dressing. It was discontinued and there are no plans to bring them back to US menus. Smokey Bones Barbeque and Grill has recently introduced a Portobello Chicken Wrap to broaden their selection of grilled menu items.

See also

 Afghani burger
 Burrito
 Cheese roll
 Dürüm
 Doner kebab
 Falafel
 Gyro (food)
 List of sandwiches
 Ssam
 Shawarma
 Falafel

Notes

Fast food
Flatbread dishes
Tortilla-based dishes
American cuisine
Stuffed dishes